Miguel Vale de Almeida (born August 21, 1960 in Lisbon, Portugal) is a Portuguese, anthropologist, LGBT activist, and professor at the Instituto Superior de Ciências do Trabalho e da Empresa (ISCTE) in Lisbon. He is the current editor-in-chief of the journal Etnográfica and member of CEAS-ISCTE and APA. He was Visiting Professor (Tinker Fellowship) Dept of Anthropology and Latin American Studies’ Center, University of Chicago in the spring of 2006. As an LGBT activist, he is known in Portugal for participating in LGBT rights events, including several appearances on LGBT debates in television.

Research interests 
 Gender, Sexuality, Body
 Race, Ethnicity, Ethnopolitics
 Post-colonial studies, Creoleness
 Portugal, Brazil, Afro-Diaspora

Books 
 A Chave do Armário. Homossexualidade, Casamento, Família (Lisboa. ICS, 2009).
Um Mar da Cor da Terra. Raça, Cultura e Política da Identidade, Oeiras: Celta. (2000)
English version: An Earth-Colored Sea. Race, Culture and the Politics of Identity in the Post-Colonial Portuguese-Speaking World, Oxford and New York: Berghahn Books. (2004)
Senhores de Si: Uma Interpretação Antropológica da Masculinidade, Lisboa: Fim de Século, colecção “Antropológica”. (first edition: 1995).
English version: The Hegemonic Male: Masculinity in a Portuguese Town, Oxford and Providence: Berghahn Books. (2004)
Outros Destinos. Ensaios de Antropologia e Cidadania - Porto: Campo das Letras. (2004)
Corpo Presente: Treze Reflexões Antropológicas sobre o Corpo (org.) - Oeiras: Celta. (1996)

Degrees 
 2000, ISCTE / Tenure.
 1994, PhD Social Anthropology, ISCTE.
 1986, Master’s Degree in Anthropology, State University of New York, Binghamton, E.U.A.
 1983, Licenciatura in Anthropology, FCSH - Universidade Nova de Lisboa.

External links
Blog

References 

1960 births
Living people
Ethnographers
Portuguese LGBT rights activists
Portuguese anthropologists
Academic staff of ISCTE – University Institute of Lisbon